The European Association for Psychotherapy (EAP) is a Vienna-based umbrella organisation for 128 psychotherapist organizations (including 28 national associations and 17 European associations) from 42 countries with a membership of more than 120,000 psychotherapists.  Individual members may also join the organisation directly rather than through one of its member organisations.

The EAP has sponsored much of the European effort from the mid-1990s toward the professionalisation of psychotherapy and the formation of pan-European training standards, ethics and guidelines.

A submission to the European Commission to establish the Common Training Framework for the Profession of Psychotherapist is currently in process (2021).

The President of EAP is Patricia Hunt (UK); the general secretary of the EAP is Prof. Eugenijus Laurinaitis (Lithuania).

The association is based on the Strasbourg Declaration on Psychotherapy of 1990 whereby the EAP promotes the need for high standards of training on a scientific basis, and fights for free and independent exercise of psychotherapy in Europe.  Important activities include:

 Creating a collaborative democratic forum for all European national and method-based professional associations in psychotherapy.
 Establishing pan-European professional post-graduate training standards consisting of a minimum of 2,400 hours, over a minimum of four years, of specialist training, with a significant component of supervised practice.
 Awarding the European Certificate of Psychotherapy (ECP): The aim of the European Certificate of Psychotherapy is to implement a comparable standard of training and mutual recognition of training across Europe. 
 Building the Register for ECP Psychotherapists: creating a searchable database of the availability of over 5,000 psychotherapists in Europe.
 Promoting EAP Ethical Guidelines: The EAP has developed ethical guidelines to protect patients and is establishing these across Europe. 
 EAP is also a founding member of the World Council for Psychotherapy (WCP).

Publication
Publication of the International Journal of Psychotherapy , a professional journal with 3 issues per annum.

References

External links 
 EAP Home page

International organisations based in Vienna
Pan-European trade and professional organizations
Mental health in Austria
Psychotherapy organizations